Julius Oiboh (born 25 November 1990) is a Nigerian football player who last played for Boeung Ket. He used to play for Navy.

References

External links 

Profile at Eurosport

1990 births
Living people
Nigerian footballers
Association football forwards
Expatriate footballers in Cambodia
Expatriate footballers in Thailand
Nagaworld FC players